Malin Krastev (Sofia), is a Bulgarian male director and actor. His major roles include the films Stonehearst Asylum (2014) and Petrov File (2015). He also plays the character Storch on the television series Magna Aura.

References

External links

Living people
1970 births
Film people from Sofia
Bulgarian male film actors
Male actors from Sofia